Douglas J. McCauley (born January 31, 1979 Los Angeles, CA) is a professor of ocean science at the University of California Santa Barbara, and serves as the Director of the Benioff Ocean Science Laboratory (formerly Benioff Ocean Initiative) - an applied ocean research center based at UC Santa Barbara's Marine Science Institute. His research focuses on using tools from ecology, data science, and marine policy for ocean conservation.

Education
McCauley received a B.A in Integrative Biology and a B.A. in Political Science, both from University of California, Berkeley in 2001. He received his Ph.D. in Biological Sciences at Stanford University in 2010. He conducted postdoctoral research at Stanford University, Princeton University, and University of California, Berkeley.

Career
McCauley began as a deckhand on a fishing boat based in Los Angeles Harbor. Prior to his appointment at UC Santa Barbara he also worked with the US National Marine Fisheries Service and  US Fish and Wildlife Service in Honolulu, HI.

McCauley is a professor at University of California Santa Barbara (Department of Ecology, Evolution and Marine Biology & Marine Science Institute). In 2016 he founded the Benioff Ocean Initiative at UC Santa Barbara with a gift from Marc Benioff and Lynne Benioff - founder and CEO of the cloud computing company Salesforce. The mission of the Benioff Ocean Science Laboratory is to leverage the power of science to solve  pressing threats challenging ocean health and inspire the replication of these successes. To date, the organization has taken on a variety of initiatives, including trying to slow the flow of plastic pollution to oceans through the Clean Currents Coalition, using technology to prevent collisions between ships and endangered whales through project Whale Safe, employing artificial intelligence to help spot white sharks at beaches through project SharkEye, creating programs for community scientists to aid in the conservation of endangered ocean species through the Spotting Giant Sea Bass project, and creating transparency tools to track the start of ocean mining.

Research
McCauley's primary areas of research expertise are in the areas of ocean science, conservation biology, and  ecology. His pure ecological research has focused on the decline of wild animals in ocean ecosystems, understanding how energy and materials flow across living ecological systems, how species are interlinked in ecological networks, and how humans as a dominant ecological force shape the dynamics of nature. His applied science includes research on how the health of nature affects human nutritional health, disease dynamics, wealth systems, and social justice.

Public Engagement
McCauley has been active on topics of ocean health and ecosystem integrity at the United Nations, the World Economic Forum, and the US White House. He serves on the advisory board of the World Economic Forum's Friends of Ocean Action.

Awards and honors
In 2015, McCauley was named an Alfred P Sloan Research Fellow. In 2018, he was named an Early Career Fellow by Ecological Society of America. In 2019, he was awarded UC Santa Barbara's Plous award. He was also named a “Human of the Year” by Vice (magazine) Media.

Selected works

McCauley has published more than 85 publications

Some of his most known publications are as follows:

References

External links
 McCauley Lab 
 Douglas McCauley UCSB Profile 
 Benioff Ocean Initiative '

1979 births
Living people
Academics from Los Angeles
Environmental scientists
Scientists from Los Angeles
Stanford University alumni
University of California, Santa Barbara faculty
20th-century American scientists
21st-century American scientists
Fellows of the Ecological Society of America